Nordstrom Rack is an American off-price department store chain founded in 1973.  It is a sister brand to the luxury department store chain Nordstrom. 

As of 2021, Nordstrom Rack operates 352 stores in 41 U.S. states and three Canadian provinces.

History 
In 1973, Nordstrom Rack opened their first store in Seattle as a clearance outlet full-line store. The first Nordstrom Rack location was in the basement of a downtown Seattle Nordstrom store.

Their website was launched in February 2014 by HauteLook which was acquired by Nordstrom in 2011. The Nordstrom Rack e-commerce site was built on a shared platform with Hautelook, which is Nordstrom's flash sale business.  When visiting the Nordstrom Rack's website, there is an option to navigate back and forth between Hautelook and Nordstrom Rack. Nordstrom Rack has an e-commerce site that has brand name options at lower prices. It is easy to search for items by type, brand name or price range.

Nordstrom Rack makes up about a fifth of Nordstrom's overall sales. Since 2013 Nordstrom Rack has generated over 2.5  billion dollars in sales.

On March 22, 2018, Nordstrom Rack opened its first store in Canada which began their global expansion.  All seven Nordstrom Rack stores in Canada are set to be closed in 2023, following Nordstrom's exit from the country.

On December 20, 2021, it was reported that Nordstrom was considering spinning-off Nordstrom Rack into a separate company.

References

External links 
 

American companies established in 1973
Clothing retailers of the United States
Companies based in Seattle
Department stores of Canada
Department stores of the United States
Discount stores of Canada
Discount stores of the United States
Family-owned companies of the United States
Online clothing retailers of Canada
Online clothing retailers of the United States
Retail companies established in 1973
1973 establishments in Washington (state)